The Wolgan River, a watercourse of the Hawkesbury-Nepean catchment, is located in the Central Tablelands region of New South Wales, Australia.

Course and features
Formed by the confluence of Carne Creek (also called Wolgan River (Eastern Branch)) and Wolgan River (Western Branch), the headwaters of the Wolgan River rise on the eastern slopes of the Great Dividing Range, northeast of Wallerawang, near Lithgow, and flows generally north by west, north, northeast, east northeast, southeast by east, and northeast by east before reaching its confluence with the Capertee River, below Mount Morgan, east of Glen Davis. The river descends  over its  course.

The majority of the river lies within Wollemi National Park; flows through the Wolgan Valley; past the deserted settlement of Newnes; and is contained within the Greater Blue Mountains Area UNESCO World Heritage Site.

See also

 List of rivers of Australia
 List of rivers of New South Wales (L–Z)
 Rivers of New South Wales

References

Central Tablelands
Hawkesbury River
Rivers of New South Wales